Milad Doueihi (born 1959) is a Syrian-Lebanese cultural and intellectual historian. He is Professor of Digital Humanities at Paris-Sorbonne University.

Life
Doueihi was Directeur d'Études Associé at the École des Hautes Études en Sciences Sociales in Paris. In 2000 he was a Prize Fellow at the American Academy in Berlin.

Works
 'The Traps of Representation', Diacritics 14:1 (Spring 1984), pp. 66–77
 (ed.) The Metis of the Greeks. Diacritics 16:2 (Summer 1986)
 (ed.) Hoc est sacramentum: painting blasphemy, Modern language notes 109 (1994)
 A perverse history of the human heart, Cambridge, Massachusetts: Harvard University Press, 1997
 La grande conversion numérique, suivi de Rêveries d’un promeneur numérique, Paris: Seuil, 2008. Translated as Digital cultures, 2011. Cambridge, Massachusetts: Harvard University Press, 2011.
 Earthly paradise: myths and philosophies, Cambridge, Massachusetts: Harvard University Press, 2009. Translated by Jane Marie Todd.
 Solitude de l'incomparable, Paris: Seuil, 2009.
 Augustine and Spinoza, Cambridge, Massachusetts: Harvard University Press, 2010.
 Pour un humanisme numérique, Paris: Seuil, 2011.

References

External links
 Guest colloquium by Milad Doueihi - Digital Humanism

1959 births
Living people
Academic staff of Paris-Sorbonne University
Academic staff of Université Laval
American writers in French
20th-century American historians
21st-century American historians